Takuyumam is a former Chumashan settlement in Los Angeles County, California. Its former location is now the site of Newhall.

References

Former settlements in Los Angeles County, California
Former populated places in California
Chumash populated places